Znamenskiy Island is a high, nearly round,  long ice-covered island, lying in Rennick Bay just north of the terminus of Rennick Glacier in Antarctica. Charted by the Soviet Antarctic Expedition in 1958 and named for Soviet hydrographer K.I. Znamenskiy (1903–41).

See also
 List of antarctic and sub-antarctic islands

Islands of Victoria Land
Pennell Coast